Maud's Bridge was a small railway station built by the South Yorkshire Railway on its line between Thorne and Keadby. The station was situated between Thorne and Medge Hall.

History

Only a couple of miles to the east the line crosses the county boundary, leaving Yorkshire and entering Lincolnshire. It was at Maud's Bridge that the new 'straightened' track from Thorne South, opened in 1864, rejoined the original route along the canal. The station closed to passengers on 1 October 1866; in the meantime, the SYR had been leased to the Manchester, Sheffield and Lincolnshire Railway in June 1864.

Notes

References 

Disused railway stations in Doncaster
Former South Yorkshire Railway stations
Railway stations in Great Britain opened in 1859
Railway stations in Great Britain closed in 1866